Marco Paolo Z. Morales (born July 16, 1982), widely known as Marco Morales, is a television and film actor in the Philippines.

Life and career 
Morales was born in Bulacan, Philippines. He started his acting career in 2007 including You Got Me! and Paano Kita Iibigin where he played some minor roles. He had a small role in the GMA Films My Best Friend's Girlfriend directed by Mark A. Reyes. In 2008 he had a part in the Joel Lamangan film  "Walang Kawala" starring Polo Ravales and Joseph Bitangcol where he was tagged as the "frontal nudity king." He also did Butas, Booking, Big Time, Pipo and Heavenly Touch, where he co-starred with Paolo Serrano and Gwen Garci. He's in DMV Entertainment's indie movie I Luv DreamGuyz, directed by Joel Lamangan released in 2009. His new film is currently filming in Dipolog with a working title Linabo.

Aside from movies he is also a television actor where he had a recurring role in Bud Brothers which was recently aired on ABS-CBN. In 2010 he got a supporting role in GMA Network's series Heaven In Your Arms starring Heart Evangelista and Katrina Halili. In August 2010, Morales was chosen for a part in the television pilot of GMA Network's Koreana  playing Phillip Jung. Unfortunately his character was killed off due to his commitment in the film Linabo.

Arrest 
The independent film actor was arrested by the Makati police in June 2013. Morales was charged with fraud, and released after posting an P8,000 cash bond.

Television

Movies
2012 "Therapist" the accused

References

External links 

1982 births
Living people
Filipino male models
Filipino male television actors
Male actors from Bulacan
Filipino male film actors